Samuli Saarela (born 17 March 1988) is a Finnish mountain bike orienteer. He won a gold medal in the middle distance at the 2010 World MTB Orienteering Championships in Montalegre.

References

Finnish orienteers
Male orienteers
Finnish male cyclists
Mountain bike orienteers
Living people
1988 births
Place of birth missing (living people)
Finnish mountain bikers